Craig Harlan Janney (born September 26, 1967) is an American former professional ice hockey center who played twelve seasons in the National Hockey League from 1987–88 until 1998–99, when blood clots ended his career prematurely.

Playing career
Known as an excellent puck-distributing center, Janney averaged nearly one point per game in his NHL career. Janney was drafted in the first round, 13th overall by the Boston Bruins in the 1986 NHL Entry Draft, and also played in the 1987 World Ice Hockey Championships, 1991 Canada Cup and the 1994 World Ice Hockey Championships for Team USA.

Prior to his NHL career, Janney attended Enfield High School in Enfield, Connecticut before attending Deerfield Academy. Janney played for the Boston College Eagles during his collegiate years, and he also played on the 1988 U.S. Olympic Team that finished seventh at the Calgary Olympic Games, where he had six points in five Olympic contests.

In 1992, the Boston Bruins traded Janney with Stephane Quintal to the St. Louis Blues for Adam Oates.  Two years later, the St. Louis Blues signed restricted free agent Petr Nedvěd who was in a contract dispute with the Vancouver Canucks.  An arbitrator awarded the Canucks a second round draft pick along with Craig Janney.  Both teams were not satisfied with the decision and the Canucks traded Janney back for Jeff Brown, Bret Hedican and Nathan LaFayette.  In 1995, the St. Louis Blues traded Janney to the San Jose Sharks for Jeff Norton and a conditional draft pick.  One year later, Janney was traded to the Winnipeg Jets for Darren Turcotte and a second round draft pick. Janney joined the team when it relocated to become the Phoenix Coyotes, before being traded to the Tampa Bay Lightning on June 11, 1998, along for the rights to Louie DeBrusk and a 5th round pick in 1998.

In 2004, Craig Janney was honored as having "The Softest Hands in Hockey" by the NHL Alumni Board. On February 13, 2007 Janney was named the interim head coach of the Lubbock Cotton Kings of the CHL. He would finish the season, but the Lubbock Cotton Kings would cease operations at the end of the 2007 season.

Recently, Janney has been appearing on NESN for Hockey East coverage. He currently resides in Scottsdale, Arizona with his wife, former model Kim Janney and daughter Barrette Janney.

Janney is a 1996 inductee of the Enfield Athletic Hall of Fame.

Career statistics

Regular season and playoffs

International

Awards and honors

References

External links

1967 births
Living people
American men's ice hockey centers
Boston Bruins draft picks
Boston Bruins players
Boston College Eagles men's ice hockey players
Ice hockey players at the 1988 Winter Olympics
National Hockey League first-round draft picks
New York Islanders players
Olympic ice hockey players of the United States
Sportspeople from Hartford, Connecticut
Phoenix Coyotes players
St. Louis Blues players
San Jose Sharks players
Tampa Bay Lightning players
Winnipeg Jets (1979–1996) players
Ice hockey players from Connecticut
AHCA Division I men's ice hockey All-Americans